Monty Green may refer to:

People
Monty Green, political candidate, see Electoral results for the Division of Banks
Monty Green, Israeli general and commander of Technological and Logistics Directorate

Fictional characters
Monty Green, character in The 100 (TV series)